Indian locomotive class YAM1 is the first, and so far only class of metre gauge (Y), Alternating Current (A), mixed traffic (M) electric locomotive in India. Twenty were built in 1964–66 by a Japanese consortium led by Mitsubushi.

Background
When the Madras (now Chennai) to Tambaram line was electrified in 1931, the 1500 V DC system was originally used. As part of an extension of the electrification to Villupuram in 1965, the whole section was converted to the 25 kV AC system. Eighteen YAM1 locomotives (later extended to 20) and YAU1 4-car electric multiple units were built for service on the network.

Design

The YAM1 locomotives were supplied by Mitsubishi in 1964–66 (four in 1964, 14 in 1965 and two in 1966). They were jointly built by Mitsubishi, Toshiba and Hitachi, as shown by their builders' plates. They are of the B-B configuration, with two monomotor bogies, each with one bogie-mounted DC traction motor; the two traction motors were permanently coupled in parallel. They had an Oerlikon compressor and exhauster for the locomotive's air brakes and the train's vacuum brakes, and Arno rotatory converters. They were equipped with two Faively AM-12 pantographs.

Service
They were given the fleet numbers 21904–21923.

They were used on the electrified metre gauge lines of the Southern Railway zone of Indian Railways, usually in the Chennai area. 

In their latter days, all 20 locomotives were allocated to Tambaram Electric Shed. The last use of a YAM1 was on 30 June 2004, not long after the last EMU service on Chennai network reached Tambaram.

One unit has been preserved at Chittaranjan Locomotive Works.

Locomotive shed 
  All the locomotives of this class has been withdrawn from service.

See also 

 Indian locomotive class WAM-2/3
 Rail transport in India#History
 Indian Railways
 Locomotives of India
 Rail transport in India

References

External links

 http://www.irfca.org/faq/faq-specs.html#YAM-1

Railway locomotives introduced in 1964
Metre gauge electric locomotives
Electric locomotives of India
Hitachi locomotives
Toshiba locomotives
25 kV AC locomotives
Mitsubishi locomotives